Calling Lake is a hamlet in northern Alberta, Canada within the Municipal District of Opportunity No. 17. It is located on Highway 813 along the eastern shore of Calling Lake, immediately north of Calling Lake Provincial Park.

The hamlet is located in the federal riding of Fort McMurray-Athabasca. The hamlet is the seat of the Jean Baptiste Gambler 183 Indian reserve of the Bigstone Cree Nation.

Calling Lake is recognized as two separate designated places by Statistics Canada – Calling Lake (which includes lands on either side of the Jean Baptiste Gambler 183 Indian reserve) and Centre Calling Lake (which is between the designated place of Calling Lake to the north and Calling Lake Provincial Park to the south).

Infrastructure 
Health services are provided by the Aspen Regional Health Authority, and the community is served by the Calling Lake Airport .

Demographics 

Climate

See also 
List of communities in Alberta
List of designated places in Alberta
List of hamlets in Alberta

References 

Hamlets in Alberta
Designated places in Alberta
Municipal District of Opportunity No. 17